Gretta Duisenberg-Nieuwenhuizen (born 6 November 1942) is a Dutch pro-Palestinian political activist. She is the widow of Dutch Labour Party (PvdA) politician Wim Duisenberg who was also the first president of the European Central Bank (ECB).

Duisenberg was born as Greetje Nieuwenhuizen into a strict Protestant family in Heerenveen, Friesland. She later studied nursing. Her first marriage was to the internist Bedier de Prairie, with whom she had three children. At that time she also started using the name Gretta. After their divorce, she became active in left-wing politics, human rights causes, and was briefly involved with Hans van Mierlo, at that time the Dutch Minister of Defense. She married Wim Duisenberg when he was president of De Nederlandsche Bank, the Dutch central bank.

Gretta Duisenberg came to international attention in 2002 when the media reported that the president of the ECB had a Palestinian flag hanging from his house in Amsterdam.

Gretta Duisenberg came under fire when she announced her intention of collecting six million signatures as part of her campaign to draw attention to the Israeli occupation of the Palestinian Territories. She was asked how many signatures she'd been able to gather for the petition against the occupation and replied that 6,000 supporters had signed so far. And how many signatures would you like to collect, she was asked. Duisenberg hesitated for a moment and then said, "Six million". Critics stated that the figure was clearly an allusion to the number of Jewish victims of World War II. Duisenberg denied any link to the Holocaust, and stated that she just mentioned a multiple of the 6,000 they had already collected.

In a discussion program aired on Dutch TV in November 2005, she stated she understood suicide bombings in the light of the desperate conditions Palestinians are kept in. In the same program, she stated "I hope Israel realizes it can't take over the South of Amsterdam the same way it took over the West Bank!" referring to the vandalism, complaints, and threats of legal action she received for hanging the Palestinian flag on her property. This statement caused controversy and further intensification of allegations of antisemitism by critics in the Netherlands. In July 2006, the Dutch Public Prosecution (Openbaar Ministerie, OM), after an investigation following a complaint by Dutch lawyer Abraham Moszkowicz, concluded there was no reason to prosecute, as the format of the specific TV programme was meant to incite fierce, possibly controversial and exaggerated reactions.

In 2010 the OM saw for the second time no reason to prosecute Duisenberg after allegations of sedition together with members of parliament Harry van Bommel and Sadet Karabulut. This complaint was also filed by Moszkowicz.

In early 2014, the pro-Israel group Dutch Center for Documentation and Information on Israel (CIDI), together with anti-discrimination watchdog Dutch Complaint Bureau for Discrimination on the Internet (MDI), filed criminal charges against her in the Netherlands for an article which appeared on her pro-Palestinian website, which claimed to expose "the Jewish penetration of the Internet" claiming there was a Jewish conspiracy to control the Internet. The article, which is still available on her website, states that "The Jews — contrary to the ‘liberal’ views they officially say they profess — in their suppressive acts practically demonstrate that they always seek to dominate the information flow, they don’t tolerate any dissent." Duisenberg subsequently denied the article was anti-Semitic and stated that she would not remove it from her website, although she added that "material placed on the website does not necessarily reflect our point of view."

References

External links
"Stop de bezetting" (Dutch) / "Stop the occupation of Palestine" (Summary page in English)
Gretta Duisenberg not prosecuted (Dutch newspaper article - July 14, 2006)

1942 births
Living people
Dutch nurses
Dutch political activists
Dutch women in politics
People from Heerenveen